National Route 270 is a national highway of Japan connecting Makurazaki and Ichikikushikino in Kagoshima prefecture, Japan, with a total length of 52.4 km (32.56 mi).

References

National highways in Japan
Roads in Kagoshima Prefecture